Lansbury may refer to:

 Angela Lansbury (1925–2022), British-American actress
 Bruce Lansbury (1930–2017), British-American television producer
 Coral Lansbury (1929–1991), Australian author and academic
 Edgar Lansbury (born 1930), British-born Irish-American theatre, film, and television producer; twin brother of Bruce
 George Lansbury (1859–1940), British politician
 Henri Lansbury (born 1990), English footballer
 Minnie Lansbury (1889-1922), British suffragette

See also
 Lansbury Estate, London, England, United Kingdom, named after George Lansbury
 Lansbury Park, Wales, United Kingdom